Major Ritchie and Anthony Wilding defeated Kenneth Powell and Robert Powell 9–7, 6–0, 6–4 in the All Comers' Final, and then defeated the reigning champions Herbert Roper Barrett and Arthur Gore 6–1, 6–1, 6–2 in the challenge round to win the gentlemen's doubles tennis title at the 1910 Wimbledon Championships.

Draw

Challenge round

All comers' finals

Top half

Section 1

Section 2

Bottom half

Section 3

Section 4

References

External links

Men's Doubles
Wimbledon Championship by year – Men's doubles